Michael Anthony Toglia (born August 16, 1998) is an American professional baseball first baseman and outfielder for the Colorado Rockies of Major League Baseball (MLB).

Raised in Gig Harbor, Washington, Toglia played three years of college baseball at UCLA. He was selected by the Rockies as their first round selection in the 2019 MLB draft. He played in their minor league system for four years before making his MLB debut in 2022.

Amateur career
Toglia attended Gig Harbor High School in Gig Harbor, Washington. As a senior in 2016, he hit .316 with four home runs and 21 RBIs along with pitching to a 1.00 ERA in 42 innings. After his senior year, he was drafted by the Colorado Rockies in the 35th round of the 2016 Major League Baseball draft. However, he did not sign and instead chose to fulfill his commitment to attend the University of California, Los Angeles (UCLA) to play college baseball for the UCLA Bruins. During the summer, he played in the West Coast League (WCL) for the Wenatchee AppleSox and was named the league's most valuable player as well as to the All-WCL team after he batted .306 with seven home runs and 40 RBIs.

In 2017, as a freshman at UCLA, Toglia hit .261 with eight home runs and 33 RBIs in 56 games. He received All-Pac-12 Honorable Mention and was named a Freshman All-American by Collegiate Baseball. After the 2017 season, he played collegiate summer baseball in the Cape Cod Baseball League for the Cotuit Kettleers, where he batted .248 with six home runs and 25 RBIs in 37 games. As a sophomore in 2018, Toglia started all 59 of UCLA's games, slashing .336/.449/.588 with 11 home runs and 58 RBIs, and was named to the All-Pac-12 First Team. Following the year, he returned to the Cape Cod League with the Kettleers, batting .220 with eight home runs and 24 RBIs in 38 games. Prior to the 2019 season, Toglia was named a preseason All-American by Collegiate Baseball. He finished his junior year batting .314 with 17 home runs and 65 RBIs in 63 games. He was named to the All-Pac-12 First Team for the second consecutive year.

Professional career
Toglia was considered one of the top prospects for the 2019 Major League Baseball draft. He was selected by the Colorado Rockies with the 23rd overall pick, and signed for $2.7 million. After signing, he was assigned to the Boise Hawks of the Class A Short Season Northwest League with whom he spent all of his first professional season. Over 41 games, he hit .248 with nine home runs and 26 RBIs.

Toglia did not play a minor league game in 2020 due to the cancellation of the minor league season caused by the COVID-19 pandemic. To begin the 2021 season, he was assigned to the Spokane Indians of the High-A West. In June, Toglia was selected to play in the All-Star Futures Game at Coors Field. After slashing .234/.333/.465 with 17 home runs, 66 RBIs, and seven stolen bases over 74 games, he was promoted to the Hartford Yard Goats of the Double-A Northeast on August 2. Over 41 games with Hartford, he batted .217 with five home runs and 18 RBIs. He was selected to play in the Arizona Fall League for the Salt River Rafters after the season where he was named to the Fall Stars game. He returned to Hartford to begin the 2022 season. In early August, he was promoted to the Albuquerque Isotopes of the Triple-A Pacific Coast League.

The Rockies selected Toglia's contract and promoted him to the major leagues on August 30, 2022. He made his MLB debut that night as the teams starting first baseman versus the Atlanta Braves at Truist Park, going hitless over four at-bats in a 3-2 Rockies win. He collected his first MLB hit, a single off of Kyle Wright of the Atlanta Braves, the next night. He hit his first MLB home run, a two-run home run off of Braves closer Kenley Jansen, the same night.

References

External links

UCLA Bruins bio

1998 births
Living people
Baseball players from Phoenix, Arizona
Baseball players from Washington (state)
Major League Baseball first basemen
Colorado Rockies players
UCLA Bruins baseball players
Cotuit Kettleers players
Boise Hawks players
Spokane Indians players
Hartford Yard Goats players
Salt River Rafters players
Albuquerque Isotopes players